Versus Arthritis is the UK's largest charity dedicated to supporting people with arthritis. It was launched in September 2018, following the legal merger of the two leading arthritis charities in the UK, Arthritis Research UK and Arthritis Care in November 2017.

According to research, 10 million people in the UK are affected by arthritis. It affects almost three in ten men and women over the age of 55. Versus Arthritis works to help them to remain active by funding research, campaigning and providing information for patients, the public and health professionals.

History

Arthritis Care

Arthur Mainwaring Bowen founded the British Rheumatic Association (BRA) on 1 February 1947 at the age of 25. By October, the association had 554 prospective members. Bowen’s awareness of the needs of people with arthritis began when, at the age of 19, he was diagnosed with ankylosing spondylitis. Meeting other young people with arthritis during long stays in hospital opened Bowen’s eyes to the isolation they often felt. As well as his charity work, Bowen had a career as a qualified solicitor. He married Helen Patricia in 1953. Together, they had one son and one daughter. Bowen died in his home on 31 January 1980.

By this time, the charity had grown into a national organisation with a wide range of services for people with arthritis and was renamed Arthritis Care. In that year, Arthritis News was published for the first time. It ran to 12 pages and had an initial print-run of 35,000. Jane Asher became president of Arthritis Care in 2003.

At the time of the merger, Arthritis Care was the UK's largest arthritis charity and ran four national offices (in Scotland, Northern Ireland, Wales and England) with activities coordinated by an office in London. The CEO was Judi Rhys.

Arthritis Research UK

Arthritis Research UK had been founded as the Empire Rheumatism Council in 1936, changed its name to Arthritis Research Campaign, before changing again to Arthritis Research UK in 2010 as part of a drive to raise the profile of arthritis research and the organisation itself. It also reduced the potential for confusion with a plethora of other charitable groups using the initials ARC.

Dr Stewart Adams, discoverer of Ibuprofen, opened the Arthritis Research UK Pain Centre in Nottingham, which aims to understand pain and to come up with more effective ways of dealing with it.

Similar organizations
 Arthritis Foundation - USA
 Arthritis Australia - Australia
 The Swedish Rheumatism Association - Sweden
 The Arthritis Society - Canada
 Arthritis Consumer Experts - Canada

External links
 Official website

References

Non-profit organisations based in the United Kingdom
Arthritis organizations
1936 establishments in the United Kingdom
Biomedical research foundations
Chesterfield, Derbyshire
Health charities in the United Kingdom
Organisations based in Derbyshire
Research in the United Kingdom
Science and technology in Derbyshire
Scientific organizations established in 1936